Kei Ansu Kamara (born 1 September 1984) is a Sierra Leonean professional footballer who plays as a striker for Chicago Fire of Major League Soccer. He is one of only eleven players to have scored 100 goals in MLS history, achieving the landmark in 300 appearances, and is currently third on MLS's all-time scoring list.

Early life and education
Kamara was born and raised in Kenema, Sierra Leone's second-largest city, and began his career playing for Kallon F.C. from 2001–2003. At age 16, Kamara and his family migrated to the United States through a refugee program, initially moving to Maryland, before settling with relatives in Hawthorne, California, near Los Angeles. He became an American citizen.

Kamara played college soccer at California State University, Dominguez Hills, where, in his second year, he was named third-team All-American. Kamara also spent two seasons with Orange County Blue Star in the USL Premier Development League.

Club career

2006–2009: Early MLS career
Kamara was chosen by Columbus Crew in the first round ninth overall at the 2006 MLS SuperDraft. He spent two seasons there, making 36 appearances and scoring 5 goals.

Prior to the 2008 season, he was traded to San Jose Earthquakes in exchange for Brian Carroll. However, he spent only the 2008 season there, making 12 appearances and scoring 2 goals.

On 24 July 2008, Kamara was traded to Houston Dynamo for a first-round pick in the 2009 MLS SuperDraft and allocation money. On 30 September 2008, Kamara scored two goals for MLS champion Houston Dynamo against Mexican club UNAM Pumas in a CONCACAF Champions League match.

Sporting Kansas City
On 15 September 2009, Kamara was traded to Sporting Kansas City for Abe Thompson and allocation money. Kamara had several productive seasons with Kansas City which saw him become one of the most imposing wingers in the league.

Loan to Norwich City
Kamara was a transfer target of Norwich City of the English Premier League during the winter 2013 transfer window, following an unsuccessful trial at Stoke City earlier in the off-season. It was announced on 30 January 2013 that Kamara was signed on loan by Norwich for the remainder of the 2012–13 Premier League season. Norwich had the option for a pre-negotiated permanent transfer or to return Kamara to Sporting at the end of the season, in which case Kamara would miss the first 10 matches of the MLS season. As part of the deal, Kamara's contract with Major League Soccer was extended. Norwich City announced on 5 February that Kamara was granted a visa, making him legally eligible to play for the club. He made his league debut for Norwich as an 86th-minute substitute in a 0–0 draw with Fulham four days later. On the next matchday, 23 February, he came on as a 58th-minute substitute, and 19 minutes later, scored his first goal for Norwich, equalising 1–1 against Everton with a powerful header at Carrow Road, in an eventual 2–1 victory. Kamara assisted team-mate Wes Hoolahan in the 1–1 draw against Sunderland on 17 March, as his header past the goalkeeper was deflected into the net by Hoolahan who was standing on the goal-line. Kamara later claimed the only reason he did not claim the goal as his own was that it was St. Patrick's Day, and he and Irishman Hoolahan had an Irish dance celebration planned.

Kamara quickly became a fan favourite of the Norwich support for his enthusiastic and flamboyant style of play, with some fans composing songs to recognise their new-found hero. Despite this, Kamara did not score any more in a Norwich shirt and Norwich declined the option of taking him on a permanent transfer. On 4 May 2013, Norwich City confirmed the loan deal had ended and he would be returning to Sporting Kansas City immediately.

Middlesbrough
On 2 September 2013, it was confirmed that Kamara had signed for Middlesbrough of the Championship on a two-year contract for a fee of £900,000. He made his debut for the club twelve days later, coming on as a 63rd-minute substitute in a 1–3 loss to Ipswich Town. On 17 September, Kamara made his first start and scored his first goal for Boro in a 2–2 draw at Nottingham Forest. He followed up his first goal against Forest by scoring on his home debut, a 3–3 draw against AFC Bournemouth four days later. He then scored on 5 October in a 4–1 win at home to Yeovil Town, and twenty days later in a 4–0 home win at over Doncaster Rovers. On 28 August 2014, it was announced that Middlesbrough had parted company with Kamara as his contract had been cancelled by mutual consent.

After parting ways with Middlesbrough, Kamara had a successful trial with recently promoted Championship side Wolverhampton Wanderers. However, his work permit renewal application was declined after Sierra Leone fell to 75th place in the FIFA World Rankings and Wolverhampton shifted its focus to signing Yannick Sagbo instead.

Return to Columbus 
In late August 2014, it was revealed that Kamara could return to MLS but would have to go through the league's allocation ranking system since Kansas City received a transfer fee for the player. At the time, the No. 1 spot in the allocation ranking was held by Columbus Crew SC, the club which initially drafted Kamara in 2006. On 7 October 2014 it was confirmed that Kamara had signed for Columbus and would officially be added to the roster 1 January 2015. Because he was released by Middlesbrough after the 2014 MLS roster freeze, he would not be able to appear for the Crew until the 2015 Major League Soccer season.

The following season, he helped the Crew to the play-offs by finishing second in the Eastern Conference, and finished the 2015 MLS season as the joint top-scorer of the league, alongside Toronto FC's Sebastian Giovinco, with 22 goals in 33 games, although Giovinco claimed the MLS Golden Boot due to having provided more assists throughout the season (16 compared to Kamara's 8), which was the tie-breaking criterion. In November 2015, he was named one of the three finalists for both the 2015 MLS Landon Donovan MVP Award and the 2015 Advocare MLS WORKS Humanitarian of the Year Award; he was awarded the MLS Humanitarian of the Year Award on 5 November, although he missed out on the MVP Award, which went to Giovinco. On 8 November, he scored two goals in a 3–1 win over Montreal Impact in the Eastern Conference semi-finals of the MLS Playoffs, including the decisive goal in extra-time, which allowed Columbus Crew to advance to the Eastern Conference finals. On 22 November, he scored in the first leg of the 2015 MLS Playoff Eastern Conference Finals, a 2–0 win over the New York Red Bulls, which allowed Columbus to claim the 2015 Eastern Conference Championship 2–1 on aggregate and advance to the MLS Cup Final. Due to an injury sustained in training, however, it was initially uncertain whether Kamara would be able to feature in the 2015 MLS Cup Final against the Portland Timbers; nevertheless, he played all 90 minutes of the match, scoring the only goal for Columbus in a 2–1 defeat. With 4 goals, Kamara was the top-goalscorer in the 2015 MLS Playoffs, bringing his total seasonal tally to 26 goals although he missed out on the MLS Cup MVP Award, which went to Portland's Diego Valeri.

After being signed to a Designated Player contract, Columbus got off to a rough start in the 2016 season. Kamara scored five goals in his first nine games including a brace against Montreal on 7 May 2016 where Columbus had the lead. An argument arose between Federico Higuaín and Kamara over a penalty kick, with Kei potentially getting his first hat trick in his career; however, Higuaín wanted to take it himself. The game ended in a 4–4 draw. After the game, Kamara publicly called Higuaín out in an interview after the game. As a result, he was suspended by manager Gregg Berhalter for the next game.

New England Revolution
On 12 May 2016, just five days after the penalty kick incident with Higuaín, Kamara was traded to New England Revolution in a blockbuster deal which saw Columbus receive a first-round pick in the 2017 MLS SuperDraft, a second-round pick in the 2018 MLS SuperDraft, an international roster slot for the 2016 season, general allocation money, targeted allocation money, and a percentage of any fee received should New England transfer Kamara to a club outside of MLS.

He scored his first goal for New England in a 2–1 win over the New York Cosmos. On 2 September 2017, he scored his first MLS hat trick against Orlando City in a 4–0 win.

Vancouver Whitecaps FC
On 10 December 2017, Kamara was traded by New England to Vancouver Whitecaps FC in exchange for a first-round selection in the 2019 MLS SuperDraft and a conditional second-round selection in the 2020 MLS SuperDraft.  He scored on his debut on 4 March against Montreal Impact in a 2–1 win. Kamara left Vancouver at the end of their 2018 season when his contract expired.

Colorado Rapids
On 11 December 2018, Kamara was selected by FC Cincinnati in the 2018 MLS Expansion Draft and immediately traded to Colorado Rapids in exchange for an international roster slot for the 2019 season.

He scored the second hat-trick of his professional career, and the ninth overall hat-trick in franchise history for the Colorado Rapids, in a 6–3 win over Montreal Impact on 3 August 2019. The tally meant he reached 11 league goals for the season, the most for the Rapids since Omar Cummings in 2010.

Minnesota United
On 18 September 2020, Colorado traded Kamara to Minnesota United for allocation money and a 2022 second round MLS SuperDraft pick. He scored a penalty kick against FC Cincinnati on 3 October 2020, becoming the first MLS player to score for eight different teams; no one else has scored for more than six.

HIFK Fotboll
On 30 July 2021, Kamara signed with HIFK Fotboll in Finland through the end of the 2021 season, with an option for the 2022 season.

CF Montréal
In February 2022, Kamara returned to North America, joining CF Montréal on a one-year deal, with an option for 2023. He made his debut for his new club on 23 February against Santos Laguna of Liga MX in a 2022 CONCACAF Champions League match.

International career
An international since 2008, Kamara was dropped from the national team set-up for "disciplinary reasons" in August 2019. He was recalled later that month. He retired from international duty in November 2019, blaming in part new manager Sellas Tetteh. Tetteh defended himself. Kamara later returned to the national team set-up and on 12 June 2021 Kamara scored the only goal for Sierra Leone in a victory against Benin which qualified Sierra Leone for the 2021 Africa Cup of Nations, their first since 1996.

On 21 April 2022, Kamara announced his retirement from international football.

Personal life
Kamara earned his U.S. citizenship in 2006. He is married and has three children.

Career statistics

Club

International

Scores and results list Sierra Leone's goal tally first, score column indicates score after each Kamara goal.

Honours
Sporting Kansas City
Eastern Conference (Regular Season): 2011, 2012
U.S. Open Cup: 2012

Columbus Crew
Eastern Conference (Playoffs): 2015

Individual
MLS Fair Play Award: 2007
Sierra Leonean Player of the Year: 2012
MLS Joint Top-scorer: 2015 (22 goals, alongside Sebastian Giovinco)
MLS All-Star: 2015
MLS Works Humanitarian of the Year: 2015
MLS Best XI: 2015
MLS Cup Playoffs Top-scorer: 2015

References

External links

Kei Kamara website

Living people
1984 births
Sierra Leonean footballers
People from Kenema
Sierra Leonean emigrants to the United States
Association football forwards
Cal State Dominguez Hills Toros men's soccer players
Orange County Blue Star players
Columbus Crew draft picks
Columbus Crew players
San Jose Earthquakes players
Houston Dynamo FC players
Sporting Kansas City players
Norwich City F.C. players
Middlesbrough F.C. players
New England Revolution players
Vancouver Whitecaps FC players
Colorado Rapids players
Minnesota United FC players
CF Montréal players
Chicago Fire FC players
USL League Two players
Major League Soccer players
Premier League players
English Football League players
Sierra Leone international footballers
Major League Soccer All-Stars
Designated Players (MLS)
Sierra Leonean expatriate footballers
Expatriate soccer players in the United States
Sierra Leonean expatriate sportspeople in the United States
Expatriate footballers in England
Sierra Leonean expatriate sportspeople in the United Kingdom
Expatriate footballers in Finland
Sierra Leonean expatriate sportspeople in Finland
2021 Africa Cup of Nations players